Asemoplus is a genus of short-horned grasshoppers in the family Acrididae. There are at least three described species in Asemoplus.

Species
These three species belong to the genus Asemoplus.
 Asemoplus hispidus (Bruner, 1885)
 Asemoplus montanus (Bruner, 1885) (Montana grasshopper)
 Asemoplus sierranus Hebard, 1936

References

Further reading

 
 
 
 

Acrididae